Tit for tat is an English saying meaning "equivalent retaliation".

Tit for Tat may also refer to:
 Tit for Tat (novel), an 1856 novel written anonymously
 Tit for Tat (1904 film), a French short silent film
 Tit for Tat (1921 film), a British silent comedy film
 Tit for Tat (1935 film), a short comedy film starring Laurel and Hardy
 "Tit for Tat" (7th Heaven), an episode of the TV series 7th Heaven
 "Tit for Tat (Ain't No Taking Back)", a 1968 Christmas song by James Brown
 "Tit for Tat", a song by Eddy Grant on the album Reparation
 "Tit for Tat", a story from The Railway Series 1967 book: Small Railway Engines
 Tit for Tat, a song cycle for voice and piano; see List of compositions by Benjamin Britten#Vocal

See also
 Reciprocity (disambiguation)